Worldfest India is Ferriswheel's annual international performing arts festival. Ferriswheel states that it attempts to "bring the world together in one place".  

The festival provides an experiental zone teeming with art and culture, food, handicrafts. 

Worldfest has had two editions in the years 2011 and 2012 where countries like Turkey, Poland, Spain, Malaysia, Japan, Serbia, Romania, Italy & Sri –Lanka participated and hosted over 75,000 people.

2011

As IIT Bombay's annual cultural festival, Mood Indigo attracts massive crowds; over 75,000 students from 500 colleges across the country. Mood Indigo is Asia's largest college festival. Ferris Wheel took it to the next level. Mood Indigo went international with Worldfest 2011. Ferris Wheel brought young folk dance groups from Spain, Turkey, Poland and Indonesia to share their country's rich cultural heritage. IOV Indonesia Youth performed dances inspired by nature and wildlife, rituals and harvest and farming lore, using authentic costumes and props. Spain's world-renowned group ballet ‘Ara de Madrid’, previously performed in over 25 countries, showcased the hidden traditions and customs of Spain, inspired by the art and colours of the country. The Student's Folk Ensemble "Katowice’’ of the University Silesia, Poland, presented songs and dances of Upper Silesia, the Beskidy Mountains and Zywiec.

Internationally acclaimed ‘Kleurrijke Dans’, an authentic Turkish dance group based in the Netherlands, highlighted Turkey's diverse culture with various Turkish dance traditions.

These international groups conducted workshops to facilitate cultural exchange. They connected with India by discovering Mumbai through meticulously planned sightseeing tours, parties and forays into the city.

Mr. Vivek Oberoi championed Worldfest 2011 with its core message "Today’s friendship for Tomorrow’s peace". The ideal brand ambassador, straddling not only the world of Bollywood, but especially lauded for his hands-on intervention in a myriad social causes – from helping rebuild a tsunami-ravaged village, and the World Health Organization's anti-tobacco spokesperson, to his involvement with several charities in Chennai and Mumbai.

2012

In its second consecutive year, Worldfest was a huge success and received rave reviews both in print and television media. Ferriswheel brought together young folkdance groups from an even greater range of countries: Italy, Serbia, Japan, Sri Lanka and Romania. Italy's ‘Sbandieratori dei Rioni di Cori’ practise the ancient art of flag throwing, and tosses beautifully-coloured flags with deceptive ease. The group's extensive experience and performances has earned them international acclaim.

‘Simyonov’ from Serbia, represented the richness of Serbian folklore with classical ballet at its base, and a style that was bold, powerful and displayed staggering athleticism. The ‘Taiko Drum Club Fukui Norin High School’ from Japan brought alive this ancient Japanese form of percussion using large drums with complex choreographed movement reminiscent of Japanese martial arts. Sri Lanka's Ranranga Dance Academy captivated with their performance, and are members of the International Dance Council (CID -UNESCO) for the contribution and promotion of folk art. The ‘Doinita’ folk ensemble belongs to the House of Culture of Students from Bucharest, Romania. Their repertoire included dances from all the regions in Romania.

These international groups conducted workshops to facilitate cultural exchange. This year, there were workshops, visits to the Elephanta caves, a Grand Carnival, a Night Arena, heritage walks, handicrafts on display, and even a tree planting drive.

Vivek Oberoi extended his support as brand ambassador for the second year running.

References

External links 
 
 

Cultural festivals in India
2011 establishments in Maharashtra
Recurring events established in 2011
Culture of Mumbai
2014 festivals
Festivals established in 2011
Arts festivals in India